Aalasyam is a 1990 Indian Malayalam film, directed by P. Chandrakumar and produced by T. K. Balachandran. The film stars P.Sukumar (Kiran) and Poonam Dasgupta in the lead roles. The film has musical score by A. T. Ummer.

Cast
P. Sukumar (Kiran)
Poonam Dasgupta

Soundtrack
The music was composed by A. T. Ummer and the lyrics were written by Poovachal Khader.

References

External links
 

1990 films
1990s Malayalam-language films
Films directed by P. Chandrakumar